Rao Venkata Kumara Mahipati Surya Rau (1885–1964) was Maharajah of Pithapuram. He was called by Telugu people "Abhinava Krishnadevaraya". Maharani Sita Devi of Baroda was his daughter.

Early life
Surya Rau was born to Raja Gangadhara Raju and Maharani Mangamamba Devi on 5 October 1885 in the Pithapuram Fort and was named 'Suryaraya'. Gangadhar Raju married seven wives, but did not bear any children for sometime. Before his birth, Maharajah adopted a boy from the Venkatagiri royal family. This late birth and adoption led to endless litigation between 1891 and 1899. Finally the Privy Council decided in favour of the new-born prince. According to the will written by his father, Gollaprolu Estate was given to the adopted son.

His childhood was passed by the sad experience of the death of his father at the age of 5 years and mother at the age of 9 years. However he was looked after by his stepmother Chittada Rani.

He was placed under the care of the Court of Wards and admitted in Newington College, Madras. The Principal Morrison allowed the young prince to come under the influence of Indian Culture through study of Sanskrit and Telugu languages. His tutor, who became later his mentor, was Mokkapati Subbarayudu, a great scholar and a noble soul. Mokkapati was equally proficient in English and Telugu and devoted to the ideal of 'plain living and high thinking'. Mokkapati was to be Maharajah what Aristotle was to Alexander - teacher, friend, philosopher and counsellor.

His teacher introduced his own teacher Raghupathi Venkataratnam, who in due course his spiritual master and inspirer of noble deeds. He also came in contact with another great soul Kandukuri Veeresalingam.

He married Chinnamamba Devi in 1905. She was the eldest daughter of Raja Meka Venkata Rangayya Apparao Bahadur, Zamindar of Kapileswarapuram

Contribution to Telugu Language
The zamindar of Pithapuram sponsored the monumental classical Telugu dictionary, Suryarayandhranighantuvu, and even commissioned the first typewriter in Telugu.

Publications
Surya Rau garu from the early age devoted his time and energy to the development of literature, patronage of authors and many other philanthropic activities. The following is list of books dedicated to him:
 Adipudi Somanatha Kavi - Vijayendra Vijayamu
 Allamraju Subrahmanyam - Subhadra Parinayamu
 Chavali Rama Sudhi - Sahitya Chintamani
 Chintalapudi Ellana - Vishnumaya Natakam
 Dasari Lakshmana Swami - Amruta Kalasamu, Bhaktajana Manoranjanamu, Varnanaratnakaramu
 Devaguptapu Bharadwajam - Sri Suryarat Satakamu
 Devulapalli Subbaraya Sastri - Mahendra Vijayamu
 Devulapalli Venkata Krishna Sastri - Krishna Paksham, Nayanollasamu, Yatiraja Vijayamu
 K. Rajamannar - Sri Suryarat Prabhu Darsanamu
 Kandala Sathagopacharyulu - Peethapuri Vijayamu
 Kasibhatla Subbaraya Sastri - Sri Ramottareti Vruttamu
 Kilambi Gopala Krishnamacharyulu - Pithapura Maharaja Charitam
 Kotikalapudi Sitamma - Geetasaram, Viresalinga Charitra
 Kurumella Venkata Rao - Ma Maharajuto Doora Teeralu
 Madhunapantula Satyanarayana Sastri - Parivabhyudaya Kavyam, Ratna Panchalika, 
Shad darsana Sangrahamu, Surya Saptati
 Malladi Suryanarayana Sastri - Kalapoornodayam, Uttara Hari Vamsam
 Nadakuduti Viirraju - Vibhrama Tarangini
 Padala Rama Reddi - Andhra Pradesh Vidya Vishayaka Saasanamulu
 Pasupuleti Venkanna - Seeta Vijayamu
 Puranapanda Mallaya Sastri - Andhrasutra Bhashyam, Sukraneeti Saaramu
 Ramakrishna Kavulu - Andhra Katha saritsaagaramu, Damayanti Kalyanamu, Madalasa, Suvritti Tilakamu, Viswagunaadarsamu,Vyaasabhyudayamu
 Sarvajna Singa Bhoopala - Ratnapaanchaalika
 Sri Tarakam, M.R.Appa Rao, Venkata Parvatiiswara Kavulu - Brahmarshi Venkata Ratnam Jeevita Sangrahamu-Upadesalu-Kathalu
 Sripada Krishnamurti Sastri - Brahmaanandamu
 T. Achyuta Rao - Vijayanagara Samrajyam - Andhra Vangmaya Charitam, Life of Pingali Surana
 Taallapaka Tiruvengala natha - Paramayogi Vilasamu
 Uppalapu Subbaraja Kavi - Sri Suryaraya Vijayamu
 Varanasi Venkateswara Kavi - Ramachandropakhyanam
 Vavilakolanu Subbaraya Kavi - Valmiki Ramayanam
 Vedam Venkataraya Sastri - Andhra Naishada Vyakhya
 Oleti Bhaskara Rama murti - Srirama Jananamu
 Oleti Parvateesam - Suvarnamala

Honours
 Andhra University awarded him Kala Prapoorna in 1953.

References
  Sri R.V.K.M. Surya Rau Bahadur, Maharajah of Pithapuram by I. V. Chalapati Rao, Published by Telugu University, Hyderabad, 1967.
 Velcheru Narayana Rao, Print and Prose in India's Literary History: Essays on the Nineteenth Century, https://books.google.com/books?id=2N046vzK824C&pg=PA157&dq=telugu+typewriter&hl=en&ei=WxumTP7vM5HqvQOUpKH9DA&sa=X&oi=book_result&ct=result&resnum=9&ved=0CE0Q6AEwCA#v=onepage&q=telugu%20typewriter&f=false

Telugu writers
1885 births
1964 deaths
People from East Godavari district
Poets from Andhra Pradesh
Telugu poets
Indian male poets
20th-century Indian poets
20th-century Indian male writers